The Journal of Neurogenetics is a quarterly peer-reviewed scientific journal that covers all aspects of neurogenetics. It is published by Taylor & Francis and the editor-in-chief is Chun-Fang Wu (University of Iowa).

Abstracting and indexing 
The journal is abstracted and indexed in:

According to the Journal Citation Reports, the journal has a 2017 impact factor of 1.536.

See also

References

External links

Publications established in 1983
Quarterly journals
Behavioural genetics journals
Taylor & Francis academic journals
English-language journals